Honolulu is the capital and the most populous community of the state of Hawaii in the United States. 

Honolulu may also refer to:

Ships
 , several Los Angeles Steamship Company ships
 USS Honolulu, several United States Navy ships

Other uses
 Honolulu (film), a 1939 musical film starring Eleanor Powell and Robert Young
 Honolulu (magazine), covering Honolulu and the Hawaii region
 Honolulu (pool), a pocket billiards game
 Honolulu County, Hawaii (officially the City and County of Honolulu), encompassing the entire island of Oahu
 Honolulu, a song by Australian band Last Dinosaurs from the 2014 album In a Million Years
 A guide dog belonging to blind hiker Trevor Thomas
 Teniku Talesi Honolulu, former acting governor-general of Tuvalu.